Cheshire (Jade Nguyen) is a DC Comics fictional character. She is a long-standing rival of the superhero team, the Teen Titans, and occasional love interest of Roy Harper.

Publication history
Cheshire first appeared in New Teen Titans Annual #2 (1983) and was created by Marv Wolfman and George Pérez.

Fictional character biography

Post-Crisis
Born (allegedly) to a French father, Andrê Chaumont, and a Vietnamese mother, Anna Nguyen, Jade Nguyen had an unhappy childhood and was sold into slavery. As a young adult, after killing her master, Jade was informally adopted by Chinese freedom fighter Weng Chan, who taught her all he knew about guerrilla fighting. She acquired knowledge of poisons from Kruen Musenda, a famed African assassin known as the "Spitting Cobra", whom she was married to for the two years prior to his death.

She is a long-standing rival of the superhero team the Teen Titans. However, when Roy Harper, a.k.a. the archer Speedy, went undercover for the government in a mission to get her confidence and turn her over, the two fell passionately in love. Knowing he would not be able to turn her in, he walked out; Cheshire would not learn his true identity until later. The result of their romance was a daughter, Lian, whom Roy raised.

Returning to her mercenary ways after leaving Lian behind for Roy, Jade saved Deathstroke's life so he could help her in stealing nuclear weapons from Russia in an attempt to blackmail the world. To prove she is not bluffing, she obliterates the fictional Middle East nation of Qurac, reasoning that since Qurac is a stronghold of Onslaught terrorists, that Western countries would be secretly grateful. Cheshire's plans were foiled when her base came under attack and she was forced to flee. She later created her own team, The Ravens.

In Showcase '95 #8, Jade was revealed to have a brother named Luke Chaumont.

Cheshire volunteered to join Tartarus, a group created by Vandal Savage with the objective of destroying the Titans. During a confrontation with the Titans and the H.I.V.E, Savage shot Cheshire to distract Arsenal. She recovered, but was taken into custody for crimes including destroying Qurac. Sentenced to life imprisonment, she was broken out by the Ravens. Arsenal, however, forced her back into custody.

Eventually, Cheshire discovers that her biological father was a Senator named Robert Pullman, and she attempted to torture and kill him. To that end, she defeated Lady Shiva, and devised a plan to use her to fake her own death and flee the country with her daughter. Jade ties up Shiva, gags her and locks her in the trunk of her car (which was wired to explode), hoping that the authorities will find the charred body of an Asian woman in the flaming car wreck and believe that Jade was killed while fleeing the Senator's murder. On her unfortune, Catwoman and Gypsy show up and untie Shiva, while Huntress and Black Canary stop Jade from murdering the Senator, and then take her into custody. While escaping the scene of the attempted assassination, Jade is punched in the face and thrown out of the helicopter the women were escaping in by Black Canary to avoid being beaten to death by an enraged Shiva.

In 2005, she appeared in the miniseries Villains United as a member of the Secret Six. Cheshire had been blackmailed into joining by Mockingbird, who claimed that there was a small bomb implanted in the back of Lian's head. During the series, she slept with Thomas Blake, a.k.a. Catman, and became pregnant with a replacement child, thereby allowing her to leave the team and no longer needing to worry for Lian's safety. At the end of the miniseries, having betrayed the Six to Luthor's Society, she is shot and critically wounded by Deathstroke. As the faux Luthor orders the Society's withdrawal, one of his last commands is to bring Cheshire with them, provided she is still alive.

After the "Villains United" series, she later turned up alive, living in a mansion in the Himalaya Mountains with her son by Blake. Working with Vandal Savage again, she put out hits on the other members of the Secret Six except for Blake. Taking matters into her own hands, she stabs the Mad Hatter, who is working with the Six. Her blade was poisoned (as usual) and she later bartered the antidote to the poison to Catman in exchange for her safety.

In Justice League of America (vol. 2) #12, Cheshire was shown in prison, receiving a visit from Roy Harper and Lian.

In the Justice League of America Wedding Special, Cheshire was shown to be a member of the new Injustice League. She was later seen among the exiled villains in Salvation Run.

Cheshire returned as a member of a small army of villains attempting to collect massive bounties on the heads of the Secret Six. She manages to poison the meals of her targets, but is defeated by Jeannette.

In Justice League: Cry for Justice, Star City is destroyed by Prometheus, killing Lian. Cheshire attacks Roy, outraged at him for not keeping Lian safe, injuring him in the process. Both Roy and Cheshire continue to fight however Roy manages to pin Cheshire against the wall. Cheshire loses the will to fight and tearfully recalls the loss of her child. Roy comforts her and the two of them attempt to sleep together, but due to Roy's impotence he is unable to please Cheshire in bed, which causes more turmoil in Roy's life forcing him to angrily leave.

In Secret Six Cheshire's son from her involvement with Catman (Thomas Blake) is kidnapped; chronologically this takes place after the death of Lian. Catman goes on a murderous rampage believing the child to already be dead only to find the man who orchestrated the kidnapping has given the boy to a loving childless couple and that the kidnapping itself was an act of revenge against Cheshire for murdering his family. Catman, after realizing the child is better left where he is, informs Cheshire that their son is dead. This sends her in to a sorrowful rage, while Catman tells his son to rest in peace after killing all of the kidnappers involved.

Cheshire is now a member of Deathstroke's new team of Titans. Their first assignment was murdering Ryan Choi. It is unforeseen how long she will stay on the team, but it seems one of Deathstroke's goals is to taunt her into overcoming her lost edge after Lian's death. She later contacts Roy, forcing him into joining Deathstroke's team so the two of them can kill Deathstroke. Cheshire rationalizes that Roy "owes" her for Lian's death, but while it appears Roy double-crosses her, it is part of Cheshire's plan. Afterward, Deathstroke and his team arrive at South Pacific Island to kill cult leader, Drago, over the arena production of blind warriors; however, his team, Cheshire, and Roy betray him, revealing that they had been working with Drago. Cheshire and Roy's plan backfired, because Drago never intended to give Cheshire her freedom back. Their attempt to defeat Drago and escape failed miserably. Later, Drago explained to Cheshire that he needs an heir, and she was going to provide him with one. Drago tries to convince Cheshire to succumb to him, but Drago was reading her mind and using her thoughts against her. Cheshire is rescued by Deathstroke and the Titans. When Drago is defeated, Deathstroke allows him to live and the Titans then leave his island. Cheshire and Roy choose to re-join the Titans. Upon returning to the labyrinth, Deathstroke reveals to them that his preceding deeds were used to create a healing machine called a "Methuselah Device" for his dying son, Jericho. After healing Jericho, Deathstroke claims the machine can also resurrect the dead, offering Cheshire and Roy the chance to revive Lian. Cheshire accepts, but Roy refuses, saying that he has been punishing himself for his daughter's death and that Lian is in a better place. Cheshire joins Tattooed Man and Cinder in fighting the other Titans to destroy the Methuselah Device. After Cinder sacrifices herself to destroy the Methuselah, Cheshire leaves and tells Roy that she will never forgive him.

Fatherhood question
It was in the Birds of Prey story arc Sensei and Student that Cheshire herself states that she had found out the real identity of her father, U.S. Senator Robert Pullman. According to her, Senator Pullman beat her mother and left her alone with a child.

As of "Infinite Frontier", Cheshire is no longer the daughter of Senator Pullman, as she is stated to only be Vietnamese.

The New 52
In The New 52, Cheshire first appears in Grifter, becoming a team with Deathblow to aid Cole Cash. In this timeline, the character is originally only referred to as Niko, not as Cheshire. Later, she betrays Grifter and Deathblow revealing she was an undercover agent for Helspont, but later was defeated by them when they tried to stop Helspont's plans.

Cheshire is later seen as a member of the League of Assassins when they plan to recruit Red Hood.

Cheshire appears in Aquaman and the Others, teaming up with KG Beast and a group of terrorists known as Mayhem to steal the launch codes to a soviet-era satellite full of nuclear weapons in order to hold the Earth to ransom.

DC Rebirth
In Rebirth, Cheshire appears as one of the bounty hunters trying to kill Wonder Woman. Cheshire is also one of the assassins hired by the Ninth Circle in order to eliminate Green Arrow. She later attempts to kill Batman. She is stated to be one of the most toxic individuals on the planet, along with Copperhead. They attack Batman on a train, and he responds by blowing himself up into a lake below. Cheshire and Copperhead comment on his resilience.

Arsenal is shown tracking Chesire down in Nightwing #43. It's stated that they used to date but parted ways due to Jade's villainous tendencies. Chesire is seen leading a mission for the League of Assassins with the intent of carrying out a citywide catastrophe, but her plans are thwarted by Nightwing, Damian Wayne and Roy.

Cheshire was hired by the Brotherhood of Evil to steal a sample of drug material called Bliss. In the same time, Roy Harper is on the trail for the drug as well. Cheshire plays him into helping her, poisoning him during a sexual encounter leading him to believe he had relapsed on drugs. Soon after, still under the employ of the Brotherhood, she, along with a few thugs, defends Monsieur Mallah and The Brain by fighting off Arsenal. Devastatingly mismatched, Arsenal is nearly beaten to death by the thugs while Cheshire steps back and watches. She spares him the misfortune of being beaten to death and provides him with euthanasia. As she is about to do so, Donna Troy arrives to stop her. Nearly losing to her, Cheshire attempts to taunt Donna into killing her as she was told of recent events that were highly sensitive to Donna. As she decides what to do next with Cheshire, Arsenal defeats her with a trick arrow.

Cheshire secretly attends Roy Harper's funeral, standing away far from everyone else, in the back. She looks inexpressive, yet sheds a single tear, possibly feeling remorse their about last interaction.
She re-appears in Green Arrow comics as a member of the "Ninth Circle".

Cheshire later appeared in James Tynion's first arc on Batman. She's one of the assassins, along with Deathstroke, Merlyn, Gunsmith and Mr. Teeth, hired by Penguin and the Designer to kill Batman. She evaded capture from the GCPD and almost tries to kill Batman, but was hit by a truck, while Batman slid from underneath the truck. Batman brings her in to custody, until the other assassins helped her escape. Cheshire, along with Merlyn, would later attempt to attack Catwoman and Harley Quinn at a cemetery, but were both defeated by them.

Infinite Frontier
Cheshire reappeared in the Infinite Frontier event, now wearing a mask similar to her Young Justice counterpart. In a flashback, Jade is shown fleeing from ninjas with her daughter, Lian. To protect her, Jade took Lian to a local church in Gotham, referring to the then-sleeping girl as Lotus before departing back into the night.

Moreover, Jade is reinstated that her heritage as only vietnamese, therefore she is no longer stated to be the daughter of Senator Pullman, or André Chaumont and Anna Nguyen.

Throughout Catwoman #33-38, Jade is shown pursuing a redemption path alongside Clayface, and other villains such as Firefly and Knockout. Together, they aided Catwoman to save Alleytown from the Magistrate. In Catwoman #38, Jade was reunited with her now teenage daughter Lian.

In Harley Quinn Vol. 4 Annual, Jade helped Solomon Grundy to find Harley, who had been abducted by Keepsake.

Skills and abilities
Cheshire is a skilled hand-to-hand combatant, and is one of the premiere martial artists and hand-to-hand combatants in the DC Universe. She is trained in several martial arts thought forever lost. In addition, Cheshire is also an expert triple-jointed acrobat, and uses this skill to move quickly and unexpectedly, and to also augment her fighting abilities. Of bigger concern are her artificial fingernails, which she dips in several varieties of poisons. She gives her weapons and other accessories a similar treatment. In Birds of Prey #63, Black Canary calls her "the second most deadly assassin in the world", only topped by Lady Shiva.
In Aquaman and the Outsiders #11, Cheshire is called "the most dangerous woman alive".

Other versions

Flashpoint
In the Flashpoint universe, Cheshire joined with the Amazons' Furies.

Injustice: Gods Among Us
In the Injustice reality, Cheshire was a criminal that was apprehended by Hawkgirl during the fifth year of Superman's Regime.

DC vs. Vampires
In DC vs. Vampires, Cheshire is saved from a vampire by Green Arrow and the latter warns her about the impeding vampire attack on humanity and asks Jade to be on her guard.

In other media

Television

 Cheshire makes non-speaking appearances in season five of Teen Titans. This version is a new recruit of the Brotherhood of Evil with the ability to turn invisible save for her mask's eyes and grin, akin to the Cheshire Cat.
 The Teen Titans incarnation of Cheshire appears in the "New Teen Titans" segment of DC Nation Shorts.
 Cheshire appears in Young Justice, voiced by Kelly Hu. This version is a member of the League of Shadows who wields a pair of sai and a technologically advanced mask that can perform a number of functions, such as enhancing footprints and filtering out poisonous gases. Additionally, she is the daughter of Sportsmaster and Paula Nguyen and older sister of Artemis Crock. In between seasons one and two, Cheshire betrayed the Shadows to save Red Arrow, whom she married, and gave birth to a baby girl named Lian Nguyen-Harper. In between seasons two and three however, Cheshire left Lian in Artemis and Red Arrow's care to focus on her criminal activities as she feels unworthy to be Lian's mother and part of a normal family despite still loving Lian and Red Arrow. In season four, Cheshire reveals to Artemis that she fears being a bad influence on Lian. Upon hearing of her plight, Ra's al Ghul agrees to help rehabilitate Cheshire, who stays on Infinity Island to work on herself.

Film
 Jade appears in the DC Universe animated film, Batman: Soul of the Dragon, voiced by Jamie Chung. This version is a martial arts student of O-Sensei who frequently challenges her master's decisions. She is murdered by her fellow student Rip Jagger to open a mystical gate to the realm of the serpent god Nāga.
 Jade appears in the DC Universe animated film Catwoman: Hunted, voiced again by Kelly Hu. This version is an associate of Catwoman's who possesses a Cheshire Cat mask and wields a pair of sai, a sword, and claws laced with jellyfish poison.

Video games
 The Young Justice incarnation of Cheshire appears as a boss in Young Justice: Legacy, voiced again by Kelly Hu.
 Cheshire appears as a playable character in Lego Batman 3: Beyond Gotham, voiced by Tara Strong.
 Cheshire appears as a playable character in Lego DC Super-Villains.
 Cheshire appears as a playable character in DC Heroes and Villains.
Cheshire appears as a playable character in DC Legends.

Miscellaneous
 The Teen Titans animated series incarnation of Cheshire appeared in issues #34 and #39 of Teen Titans Go!.
 Cheshire appears in DC Super Hero Girls, voiced by Nika Futterman.

References

Characters created by George Pérez
Characters created by Marv Wolfman
Comics characters introduced in 1983
DC Comics female supervillains
DC Comics martial artists
DC Comics titles
Fictional female assassins
Fictional swordfighters in comics
Fictional women soldiers and warriors
Fictional French people
Fictional mass murderers
Fictional offspring of rape
Fictional slaves
Fictional Vietnamese people
Fictional acrobats
Superheroes who are adopted